Eduardo Guerrero may refer to:

 Eddie Guerrero (1967–2005), American professional wrestler
 Eduardo Guerrero (cyclist) (born 1971), Colombian road cyclist
 Eduardo Guerrero (rower) (1928–2015), Argentine rower and Olympic gold medalist
 Eduardo Guerrero (footballer) (born 2000), Panamanian footballer